Carlos Saldanha (born 24 January 1965) is a  Brazilian animator, director, producer, and voice actor of animated films who worked with Blue Sky Studios until its closure in 2021. He was the director of Ice Age: The Meltdown (2006), Ice Age: Dawn of the Dinosaurs (2009), Rio (2011), Rio 2 (2014), Ferdinand (2017), and the co-director of Ice Age (2002) and Robots (2005). Saldanha was nominated in 2003 for an Academy Award for Best Animated Short Film for Gone Nutty and in 2018 for Best Animated Feature for Ferdinand.

Early life
Saldanha was born in Brazil, growing up in Marechal Hermes, Rio de Janeiro. Though he loved cartoons and drawing from an early age, by the time he was an adult, he initially considered a career in computer science, because he did not think a career in art was a viable option. This changed when he became aware of how computer-generated imaging was revolutionizing animation, and discovered the continuing education program at the School of Visual Arts in Manhattan. He entered that program to major in computer animation, saying, "I knew from the first day in class that this was what I wanted to do for the rest of my life". One of his instructors, recognizing his talent, convinced him to enroll in the school's MFA program. Though Saldanha and his wife, Isabella Scarpa, thought this was a risk, they opted to stay in Manhattan so that Saldanha could do so. While at SVA, he completed two prizewinning film shorts that were featured in film festivals around the world. It was also at SVA that Saldanha met MFA instructor and future film directing partner Chris Wedge, who invited Saldanha to join Wedge's company Blue Sky Studios. Saldanha graduated from SVA with a master's degree in Computer Art in 1993.

Career
During its fledgling years, Blue Sky Studios provided special effects and produced animated TV commercials. In 2002, Saldanha and Wedge co-directed the animated feature film Ice Age. The movie was a success, with an opening weekend gross of $46.3 million, the best March opening ever. After co-directing the 2005 film Robots, he broke his previous March opening record with the 2006 Ice Age sequel, Ice Age 2: The Meltdown, which Saldanha directed by himself. He would later direct the 2009 sequel, Ice Age: Dawn of the Dinosaurs. Desiring a change of location after directing three films set in icy locales, Saldanha's next project was the 2011 film Rio, which is set in Saldanha's hometown of Rio de Janeiro. Saldanha, who felt that Rio had never been fully portrayed on film, felt a responsibility to travel to the city with the other animators so that they could accurately capture Rio's unique environment and habitats. The movie grossed a reported $484 million worldwide.

In October 2012, Saldanha signed a five-year exclusive deal with 20th Century Fox to develop and produce animated and live-action projects. For this purpose, he formed in June 2013 a Fox-based production company named BottleCap Productions. In 2014, Rio 2 was released, which he directed and co-wrote. For 2017, he directed an animated feature film adaptation of The Story of Ferdinand. Saldanha is also directing for Fox a live-action adaptation of Royden Lepp's graphic novel Rust: Visitor in the Field, which he planned to make before Ferdinand. He was also developing an animated feature film based on a book Alienology from the Ologies fantasy book series.

In January 2022, it was announced that Saldanha would direct Harold and the Purple Crayon for Columbia Pictures and Davis Entertainment. The film is currently scheduled for release on June 30, 2023.

Personal life
Saldanha and his wife, mathematician Isabella Scarpa, initially lived in a studio apartment in Manhattan's Greenwich Village, but after their second daughter was born, they moved to Hoboken, New Jersey, where they had friends. They continue to live there with their children, Manoela, Sofia, Julia and Rafael. Saldanha, Isabella and their oldest daughter compete in the HOHA (Hoboken Harriers Running Club), a 5k race. Manoela and Sofia voiced a "porcupine-like critter" called "Molehog" in the film Ice Age: The Meltdown, directed by their father. In Rio, Sofia voiced Linda Gunderson as a child.

Filmography

Feature films

Short Films and Television Specials

Streaming Series

Critical reception

Awards and nominations

Collaborators
Actors
 Jake T. Austin (Rio and Rio 2)
 Jemaine Clement (Rio and Rio 2)
 Bernardo de Paula (Rio and Rio 2)
 Jesse Eisenberg (Rio and Rio 2)
 Jamie Foxx (Rio and Rio 2)
 Jeffrey Garcia (Rio and Rio 2)
 Bebel Gilberto (Rio and Rio 2)
 Anne Hathaway (Rio and Rio 2)
 Queen Latifah (Ice Age: The Meltdown and Ice Age: Dawn of the Dinosaurs)
 Denis Leary (Ice Age, Ice Age: The Meltdown, and Ice Age: Dawn of the Dinosaurs)
 John Leguizamo (Ice Age, Ice Age: The Meltdown, and Ice Age: Dawn of the Dinosaurs)
 Jay Leno (Robots and Ice Age: The Meltdown)
 Clea Lewis (Ice Age: The Meltdown and Ice Age: Dawn of the Dinosaurs)
 George Lopez (Rio and Rio 2)
 Leslie Mann (Rio and Rio 2)
 Brian Scott McFadden (Robots, Ice Age: The Meltdown, and Rio 2)
 Tracy Morgan (Rio and Rio 2)
 Tim Nordquist (Robots, Ice Age: Dawn of the Dinosaurs, Rio, and Ferdinand)
 Josh Peck (Ice Age: The Meltdown and Ice Age: Dawn of the Dinosaurs)
 Ray Romano (Ice Age, Ice Age: The Meltdown, and Ice Age: Dawn of the Dinosaurs)
 Stephen Root (Ice Age and Ice Age: The Meltdown)
 Rodrigo Santoro (Rio and Rio 2)
 Seann William Scott (Ice Age: The Meltdown and Ice Age: Dawn of the Dinosaurs)
 Cindy Slattery (Ice Age: The Meltdown, Ice Age: Dawn of the Dinosaurs, Rio, Rio 2, and Ferdinand)
 Alan Tudyk (Ice Age and Ice Age: The Meltdown)
 Chris Wedge (Ice Age, Robots, Ice Age: The Meltdown, and Ice Age: Dawn of the Dinosaurs)
 will.i.am (Rio and Rio 2)

References

External links

 

Living people
1965 births
Brazilian animated film directors
People from Rio de Janeiro (city)
Blue Sky Studios people
Sony Pictures Animation people
American animated film directors
Brazilian emigrants to the United States